Christian Mangaron Rontini (born 20 July 1999) is a professional footballer who plays as a center-back or a defensive midfielder for Malaysia Super League club Kelantan. Born in Italy, he represents the Philippines national team.

Club career

Youth
Rontini is a former youth player of Floria 2000.

Sangiovannese
In 2018, Rontini joined Serie D/E club Sangiovannese on a 1-year deal.

After an impressive season, Rontini renewed his contract with Sangiovannese that will keep him with the club until June 2020.

Azkals Development Team
As of October 2021, Rontini was signed with the Azkals Development Team (ADT) of the Philippines Football League (PFL).

International career
Rontini was born to Italy to an Italian father and a Filipina mother, which made him eligible to represent either Italy or the Philippines at international level.

U-23
Rontini was part of the Philippines U-22 squad that competed at the 2019 SEA Games on home soil.

Rontini was included in the 20-man squad for the 2021 SEA Games held in Vietnam. He scored his first goal for the Philippines in a 4-0 win against Timor-Leste.

Senior team
In 2019, it was reported that Rontini received an invitation to train with the Philippines national team.

Rontini received his first call-up for the Philippines in a friendly match against China PR. He replaced Curt Dizon in the 86th minute of the match.

References

External links
 
 

1999 births
Living people
People from Bagno a Ripoli
Citizens of the Philippines through descent
Filipino footballers
Philippines international footballers
Italian footballers
Filipino people of Italian descent
Italian people of Filipino descent
Association football midfielders
A.S.D. Sangiovannese 1927 players
Competitors at the 2019 Southeast Asian Games
Azkals Development Team players
Competitors at the 2021 Southeast Asian Games
Sportspeople from the Metropolitan City of Florence
Footballers from Tuscany
Southeast Asian Games competitors for the Philippines
Malaysia Super League players
Kelantan F.C. players